A Jolly Roger is a flag flown by pirate ships to signify an attack. 

Jolly Roger may also refer to:

People
 Jolly Roger, banjo player credited on the soundtrack of Pat Garrett & Billy the Kid
 Jolly Roger, a nickname for former Dallas Cowboys quarterback Roger Staubach

Arts, entertainment, and media

Fictitious characters
 Jolly Roger (frog), a minor character in the Banjo-Kazooie video game series
 Jolly Roger (Pirates of the Caribbean), a primary villain of the Disney MMO Pirates of the Caribbean Online
 Jolly Roger, secondary character in the animated cartoon television series I Am Weasel
 Jolly Roger, a character in Grant Morrison's comic book series The Invisibles

Fictitious vessels
 Jolly Roger, fictional ship of the pirate Captain Hook
 Jolly Roger, formerly the name of Shanghai Sam's vessel in the Bugs Bunny cartoon "Mutiny on the Bunny", now called the Sad Sack
 Jolly Roger, a Sunracer-class scoutship from the computer game Space Rogue

Other uses in arts, entertainment, and media
 Jolly Roger Records, an American record label
 "The Jolly Roger" (Once Upon a Time), a television episode
 Jolly Roger Bay, a stage in Super Mario 64

Military
 Use of the Jolly Roger by submarines
 Jolly Rogers, a nickname for United States Navy Fighter Squadrons, including:
VF-17 Jolly Rogers
VF-61
VF-84
VFA-103
, a United States Navy patrol vessel in commission from December 1917 or early 1918 to November 1918

Sports
 Jolly Roger (horse), steeplechase racehorse
 "The Jolly Rogers", the factory-sponsored ski and snowboard team for Hertel Wax

Other uses
 Jolly Roger Amusement Park, Ocean City, Maryland, United States
 Jolly Roger Restaurant, an establishment at various locations, such as Lake City, Seattle and Nunley's Happyland in Bethpage, New York, United States
 Jolly Roger's Amusement Park, or Nunley's Happyland, Bethpage, New York, United States